Taman Duta refers to the area that Jalan Tuanku Abdul Halim (previously also named Jalan Duta) in Kuala Lumpur, Malaysia passes through. The area spans from the adjoining roundabout of Jalan Kuching, which the high flyover would take traffic straight into Jalan Ipoh and ends at the Parliament where it adjoins Jalan Mahameru. Buildings located within this area includes the Federal Territory Mosque, Federal Governmental Complex, Arkib Negara (National Archives), Kuala Lumpur Courts Complex, New Istana Negara, MATRADE Exhibition and Convention Centre complex and Tun Razak Hockey Stadium.

Politics
Taman Duta falls mostly within Segambut constituency.

Public transportation
 KTM Segambut
rapidKL bus T821 from  MRT Semantan

Suburbs in Kuala Lumpur